American Demo is the debut album by The Indelicates and was released on 14 April 2008.

Track listing 
 New Art for the People (Theme)
 The Last Significant Statement To Be Made in Rock'n'Roll
 Our Daughters Will Never Be Free
 Better to Know
 Sixteen
 Julia, We Don't Live in the '60s
 Stars
 New Art for the People
 Unity Mitford
 If Jeff Buckley Had Lived
 America
 Heroin
 We Hate the Kids
 Outro

References 

2008 debut albums